Enolmis bimerdella is a moth of the family Scythrididae. It was described by Otto Staudinger in 1859. It is found in Spain.

References

Scythrididae
Moths described in 1859